Woomargama National Park is a national park situated  south east of Holbrook and  north east of Albury, in the South West Slopes region of southern New South Wales. Southern extremities of the park are within one kilometre of Lake Hume which is formed on the Murray River. The park extends over approximately 30 km from eastern to western boundaries and 15 km in a north to south direction. In 2006, the park covered an area of 23,577 hectares and at the same time an area of associated reserve covered 7,120 hectares. In 2010 the park alone covered 24,185 ha.

Woomargama was gazetted, from the formation of Woomargama, Dora Dora and Tipperary State Forests along with other Crown Land portions, in January 2001 as part of the Southern Regional Forest Agreement in 2000.

Wild Life 
Birdwatchers and other wildlife enthusiasts will love this place. Some of the bird species that can be found here are regent honeyeater, superb parrot and powerful owl. Other native species include echidnas, wombats, gliders, kangaroos and wallabies.

References

See also 
 Protected areas of New South Wales (Australia)

National parks of New South Wales
Protected areas established in 2001
2001 establishments in Australia